Las Venganzas de Beto Sánchez is a 1973 Argentine dramatic comedy film directed by Héctor Olivera and starring Pepe Soriano, Federico Luppi, Irma Roy, China Zorrilla and Héctor Alterio.

Plot
A man named Beto Sánchez, seeing his father dying in hospital, decides to get revenge on those who according to him made his life worse: his elementary school teacher, his childhood friend, his first wife, his superior in the military service and his first job's boss.

References

External links
 

1973 films
Argentine comedy-drama films
1970s Spanish-language films
Films directed by Héctor Olivera
1970s Argentine films